Thomas Magee (born July 1, 1958) is a Canadian former world champion powerlifter and strongman competitor from Winnipeg, Manitoba. He was also a professional wrestler from 1985–1990.

Early life
In his early years, Tom Magee was involved in martial arts until he turned 19. Then he went to powerlifting and bodybuilding. Magee has a strong background in boxing and held a black belt in karate.

Strongman/Powerlifting/Bodybuilding career
Magee became Canadian National Powerlifting Champion in 1981 and 1982. In 1981, Tom placed second at the IPF World Powerlifting Championship in the 125 kg weight class. He totaled 927.5 kg (SQ 355, BP 235, DL 337.5). At that same competition, Tom placed ahead of future World's Strongest Man, Jon Pall Sigmarsson. In 1982 he also won the IPF World Powerlifting Championships in Munich, Germany in the +125 kg super heavyweight division. He totaled 942.5 kg (SQ 362.5, BP 235, DL 345). The second place finished, Wayne Bouvier, had the same total, but Tom won by virtue of his lighter body weight.

Tom starred in a documentary film chronicling his training and victory at the 1982 IPF World Championships entitled Tom Magee: Man of Iron. Magee was originally planning on competing in the 125 kg heavyweight division, but decided last minute to move up to the super heavyweight class (275 lbs. and over). Magee weighed in at just 1 pound over the weight limit at 276 lbs and was the lightest man in the weight class.

Magee placed second in the 1982 World's Strongest Man Tom Magee is the only Canadian to have reached this position, fourth in the 1983 World's Strongest Man and fifth at the 1985 World's Strongest Man competitions. He won the Le Defi Mark Ten Challenge International three consecutive times, from 1984 to 1986.

Magee set a world record with a  partial deadlift from 18" off the floor during the 1983 World's Strongest Man competition.

In 1984 Magee competed as a bodybuilder to win the Mr. British Columbia bodybuilding title.

Professional wrestling career
Magee also had a brief career as a professional wrestler from 1985–1990, wrestling for the World Wrestling Federation (WWF) and in Japan. The man who chose to train Magee was Stu Hart. He wrestled in 1985 in Stampede Wrestling.

He received acclaim after one of his first matches on February 22, 1986, in the main event of a major All Japan Pro Wrestling show, where he took on Riki Choshu. Dave Meltzer of the Wrestling Observer Newsletter said of his first match: "He was the greatest combination of strength and agility the business had ever seen". Magee was given the nickname "MegaMan" and named third runner-up for the Pro Wrestling Illustrated Rookie of the Year in 1986, which was won by Lex Luger.

World Wrestling Federation (1986–1990)

Magee was signed by the WWF shortly thereafter. He defeated Bret Hart on October 7, 1986 in Rochester, New York at a television taping. The infamous match, a carry job by Hart, reportedly impressed WWF chairman Vince McMahon; the tape was thought to have been lost, as the WWE could not locate it in its vault, but has recently been uncovered. On May 13, 2019, the WWE Network aired a short documentary special entitled Holy Grail: The Search for WWE's Most Infamous Lost Match which detailed the legend behind the match, the recovery of the tape, and even featured a short interview with Magee himself interspersed with clips of his short career in the then-WWF.

After the Hart dark match, Magee began wrestling on C-level house shows in January 1987, facing Terry Gibbs, Barry O, and Frenchy Martin. He remained undefeated through the winter and spring, but the WWF gradually cooled on the young prospect.

Magee would be seen only sporadically afterwards. He wrestled a handful of house shows in Canada in January 1988, defeating Iron Mike Sharpe. On December 6, 1988 Magee returned and faced Arn Anderson at a WWF Superstars of Wrestling taping in Daytona Beach, Florida, winning via countout. Magee made a heel turn in the spring of 1989, wrestling as "MegaMan Magee". In April he was managed by Jimmy Hart at a Superstars of Wrestling tapings. As a heel he then faced Tim Horner in a series of house shows. Magee's final WWF action came on a joint WWF / Arena Wrestling Alliance tour of New Zealand in April 1990, where he defeated Royal Viking in multiple encounters.

Acting
Magee left wrestling quietly in 1990 and appeared in several movies in 1990 and 1991, most notably a film titled Stone Cold, involving a fight scene with the film's lead actor Brian Bosworth.

Later, Magee worked as a trainer at the world famous Gold's Gym in Venice Beach, California.

Assault
Magee was the victim of an assault in front of his home in Mar Vista, California in May 2018. He suffered a broken jaw, broken eye socket and concussion. According to a neighbor who was an eyewitness, six men who were involved in the assault were kicking him, and punching him in the face and in the head.

Personal records
Powerlifting Competition Records:

done in official Powerlifting full meets
 Squat -  in 80s squat suit
 Bench press - 260 kilograms (573 lb) raw
 Deadlift -  raw

World's Strongest Man Records:
 Cement Block Lift (Squat on Smith Machine) -  1982
 WSM Cheese Deadlift -  winning lift 1983 (partial deadlift with wrist straps from 18" off the floor with high bending bar)

References

External links

1958 births
Canadian bodybuilders
Canadian male professional wrestlers
Canadian people of Irish descent
Canadian powerlifters
Canadian strength athletes
Living people
Professional wrestlers from Manitoba
Sportspeople from Winnipeg
Stampede Wrestling alumni
20th-century professional wrestlers